Malindi Mosque is a mosque in Stone Town, Zanzibar, Tanzania, located near the port. It stems from the 1830s but was possible built on the site of an elder mosque that might have dated back to the 17th century or earlier. Some travel guides claim an origin in the 15th century. 

The present mosque was built in 1834-1835/1250 AH by Muhammad ben Abdulkadir al-Mansaby from the  Benadir coast in Somalia. He was a rich merchant in Zanzibar during the 1820s to the 1840s. The building was enlarged twice in 1841 and 1890. 

It has some unusual architectural features, including a cone-shaped minaret (one of just three minarets of this shape in East Africa) and a square platform.

See also
 Islam in Tanzania

References

15th-century mosques
Mosques in Zanzibar
Sunni Islam in Africa
Zanzibar City
Swahili architecture